Organized crime in Italy and its criminal organizations have been prevalent in Italy, especially Southern Italy, for centuries and have affected the social and economic life of many Italian regions since at least the 19th century.

There are six major native mafia-like organizations that are heavily active in Italy. The oldest and most powerful of these organizations, having begun to develop between 1500 and 1800, are the 'Ndrangheta from Calabria (currently considered the most powerful criminal organization in the world), the Cosa Nostra from Sicily and the Camorra based in Campania. In addition to these three long-established organizations, there are also three other significantly active organized crime syndicates that were founded in the 20th century: the Stidda of Sicily, and the Sacra Corona Unita and Società foggiana, both from Apulia.

Four other Italian organized crime groups, namely the Banda della Magliana of Rome, the Mala del Brenta of Veneto, and the Banda della Comasina and Turatello Crew, both based in Milan, held considerable influence at the height of their power but are now severely weakened by Italian law enforcement or even considered defunct or inactive.

One other group, the Basilischi of Basilicata region, is currently active but is considered to have mostly fallen under the influence of the larger and more powerful 'Ndrangheta. Other crime groups include the Casamonica clan, a criminal organization of mostly Sinti ethnicity present in Rome and operating in the area of the Castelli Romani and the Lazio coast. The latest creation of Italian organized crime (IOC), Mafia Capitale (which was partially a successor or continuation of Banda della Magliana, involving many former Banda della Magliana members and associates) was mostly disbanded by the police in 2014.

The best-known Italian organized crime group is the Mafia or Sicilian Mafia (referred to as Cosa Nostra by members). As the original group named "Mafia", the Sicilian Mafia is the basis for the current colloquial usage of the term to refer to organized crime groups. It along with the Neapolitan Camorra and the Calabrian 'Ndrangheta are active throughout Italy, having presence also in other countries.

Mafia receipts may reach 9% of Italy's GDP. A 2009 report identified 610  which have a strong Mafia presence, where 13 million Italians live and 14.6% of the Italian GDP is produced. The Calabrian 'Ndrangheta, as of 2022, the wealthiest and most powerful crime syndicate in Italy, accounts alone for over 3% of the country's GDP. 

However, at 0.013 per 1,000 people, Italy has only the 47th highest murder rate compared to 61 countries and the 43rd highest number of rapes per 1,000 people compared to 64 countries in the world. These are relatively low figures among developed countries.

Sicilian Mafia

La Cosa Nostra 
Based primarily in Sicily, the Sicilian Mafia formed in the 19th century by clans which sprang out of groups of bandits; these groups gained local power and influence. In Sicily, the word mafia tends to mean "manly" and a Mafioso considers himself a "Man of Honour." However, the organization is known as "Cosa Nostra"—Our Thing—or Our Affair. The Sicilian Mafia originally engaged in such lower-level activities as extortion, cattle theft and, upon Sicily becoming part of a democratic Italy, election slugging in addition to other kinds of relatively low-level theft and fraud.

In the 1950s, Sicily experienced a substantial construction boom. Taking advantage of the opportunity, the Sicilian Mafia gained control of the building contracts and made millions of dollars. It participated in the growing business of large-scale heroin trafficking, both in Italy and Europe and in US-connected trafficking; a famous example of this are the French Connection smuggling with Corsican criminals and the Italian-American Mafia.

The Sicilian Mafia has evolved into an international organized crime group. It specializes in heroin trafficking, political corruption, and military arms trafficking and is the most powerful and most active Italian organized crime group in the United States, with estimates of more than 2,500 affiliates located there. The Sicilian Mafia is also known to engage in arson, frauds, counterfeiting, and other racketeering crimes. It is estimated to have 3,500–4,000 core members with 100 clans, with around 50 in the city of Palermo alone.

The Cosa Nostra has had influence in 'legitimate' power too, particularly under the corrupt Christian Democratic governments, from between the 1950s to the early 1990s. Its reach included many prominent lawyers, financiers, and professionals; it has also exerted power by bribing or pressuring politicians, judges, and administrators. It has lost influence on the heels of the Maxi-Trials, the campaign by magistrates Giovanni Falcone and Paolo Borsellino and other actions against corrupt politicians and judges; however it retains some influence.

The Sicilian Mafia became infamous for aggressive assaults on Italian law enforcement officials during the reign of Salvatore Riina, also known as "Toto Riina". In Sicily the term Excellent Cadavers is used to distinguish the assassination of prominent government officials from the common criminals and ordinary citizens killed by the Mafia. Some of their high ranking victims include police commissioners, mayors, judges, police colonels and generals, and Parliament members.

On May 23, 1992, the Sicilian Mafia struck Italian law enforcement. At approximately 6pm, Italian Magistrate Giovanni Falcone, his wife, and three police body guards were killed by a massive bomb. Falcone, Director of Prosecutions (roughly, District Attorney) for the court of Palermo and head of the special anti-Mafia investigative squad, had become the organization's most formidable enemy. His team was moving to prepare cases against most of the Mafia leadership. The bomb made a crater 10 meters (33 feet) in diameter in the road Falcone's caravan was traveling on. This became known as the Capaci bombing.

Less than two months later, on July 19, 1992, the Mafia struck Falcone's replacement, Judge Paolo Borsellino, also in Palermo, Sicily. Borsellino and five bodyguards were killed outside the apartment of Borsellino's mother when a car packed with explosives was detonated by remote control as the judge approached the front door of his mother's apartment.

In 1993, the authorities arrested Salvatore Riina, believed at the time to be the Capo di tutti capi and responsible directly or indirectly for scores (if not hundreds) of killings. Riina's arrest came after years of investigation - which some believe was delayed by Mafia influence within the Carabinieri. Control of the organization then fell to Bernardo Provenzano who had come to reject Riina's strategy of war against the authorities, in favor of an approach of bribery, corruption, and influence-peddling. As a consequence, the rate of Mafia killings fell sharply, but its influence continued in the international drug and slave trades, as well as locally in construction and public contracts in Sicily. Provenzano was himself captured in 2006 after being wanted for 43 years.

In July, 2013, the Italian police conducted sweeping raids targeting top mafia crime bosses. In Ostia (Rome), a coastal community near the capital, police arrested 51 suspects for alleged crimes connected with Italy's Sicilian Mafia. Allegations included extortion, murder, international drug trafficking, and illegal control of the slot machine market.

Stidda or La Stidda 

La Stidda (Sicilian for star) is the name given to the Sicilian organization founded by criminals Giuseppe Croce Benvento and Salvatore Calafato, both of Palma di Montechiaro, in the Agrigento province of Sicily. The Stidda's power bases are centered in the cities of Gela and Favara, Caltanissetta and Agrigento provinces. The organization's groups and activities have flourished in the cities of Agrigento, Catania, Syracuse and Enna in the provinces of the same name, Niscemi and Riesi of Caltanissetta province, and Vittoria of Ragusa province, located mainly on the Southern and Eastern coasts of Sicily. The group also has members and is active in Malta.

The Stidda has extended its power and influence into the mainland Italy provinces of Milan, Genoa, and Turin. The members of the organization are called Stiddari in the Caltanissetta province, and Stiddaroli in the Agrigento province. Stidda members can be identified and sometimes introduced to each other by a tattoo of five greenish marks arranged in a circle, forming a star called "i punti della malavita" or "the points of the criminal life."

The Cosa Nostra wars of the late 1970s and early 1980s brought the Corleonesi Clan and its vicious and ruthless leaders Luciano Leggio, Salvatore "Toto" Riina, and Bernardo Provenzano into power. This caused disorganization and disenchantment inside the traditional Cosa Nostra power base and values system, leaving the growing Stidda organization to counter Cosa Nostra's power, influence, and expansion in Southern and Eastern Sicily. Stidda membership was also reinforced by Cosa Nostra men of honor, such as those loyal to slain Capo Giuseppe Di Cristina of Riesi who had defected from Cosa Nostra's ranks during to the bloodthirsty reign of the Corleonesi clan.

The organization also enlarged its membership by absorbing local thugs and criminals (picciotti) who operated at the far margins of organized crime. This allowed Stidda to gain more power and credibility in the Italian underworld.
From 1978 to 1990, former Corleonesi clan leader and aspirant to the Cosa Nostra's "Capo di Tutti Capi" title, Salvatore Riina, waged a war within Cosa Nostra and against the Stidda. The war spread death and terror among mafiosi and the public, leaving over 500 dead in Cosa Nostra and over 1,000 in La Stidda, including Stidda captains Calogero Lauria and Vincenzo Spina.

With the 1993 capture of Salvatore Riina and the 2006 jailing of Bernardo Provenzano's, a new Pax Mafiosa arose - following a new, less violent and low-key approach to criminal activities. As a result, the Stidda cemented its power, influence and credibility among the longer-established criminal organizations in Italy and around the world, making itself a bonefied underworld player.

Camorra or Campanian Mafia 

The origins of the Camorra are unclear. It may date to the 17th century, however the first official use of camorra as a word dates from 1735, when a royal decree authorized the establishment of eight gambling houses in Naples. The Camorra's main businesses are drug trafficking, racketeering, counterfeiting and money laundering. It is also not unusual for Camorra clans to infiltrate the politics of their respective areas.

The Camorra also specializes in cigarette smuggling and receives payoffs from other criminal groups for any cigarette traffic through Italy. In the 1970s, the Sicilian Mafia convinced the Camorra to convert their cigarette smuggling routes into drug smuggling routes. Yet not all Camorra leaders agreed, sparking a war between the two factions and resulting in the murder of almost 400 men. Those opposed to drug trafficking lost the war.

The Camorra Mafia controls the drug trade in Europe and is organized on a system of specific management principles. In the early 2000s, the Di Lauro clan ran the then-largest open-air market in Europe, based in Secondigliano. The former leader of the clan, Paolo Di Lauro, who designed the system, has been imprisoned since 2005. His organization however earned about €200 million (about US$200 million) annually, solely from the drug trafficking business. The Di Lauro clan war against the Scissionisti di Secondigliano inspired the current Italian television series Gomorrah.

Outside Italy, the Camorra has a strong presence in Spain. There, the organization has established a massive business operation revolving around drug trafficking and money laundering. They are known to reinvest their profits into the creation of hotels, nightclubs, restaurants and companies around the country.

It is believed that nearly 200 Camorra affiliates reside in the United States. Many came to the US during the Camorra Wars in the 1970s, establishing an extortion practice called the Black Hand and later becoming known as the Brooklyn Camorra. The New York-based Camorra conducts money laundering, extortion, human smuggling, robbery, blackmail, kidnapping, political corruption, and counterfeiting.

'Ndrangheta or Calabrian Mafia 

Derived from the Greek word andragathía (meaning courage or loyalty), the 'Ndrangheta formed in the 1890s in Calabria. The 'Ndrangheta consists of 160 cells and approximately 6,000 members, although worldwide estimates put core membership at around 10,000. The group specializes in political corruption and cocaine trafficking.

The 'Ndrangheta cells are loosely connected family groups based on blood relationships and marriages.

Since the 1950s, the organization's influence has spread towards Northern Italy and worldwide. According to a 2013 "Threat Assessment on Italian Organized Crime" by Europol and the Guardia di Finanza, the 'Ndrangheta is among the richest (in 2008 their income was around 55 billion dollars) and most powerful organized crime groups in the world.

The 'Ndrangheta is also known to engage in cocaine (controlling up to 80% of that flowing through Europe) and heroin trafficking, murder, bombings, counterfeiting, illegal gambling, frauds, thefts, labor racketeering, loan sharking, illegal immigration, and rarely some kidnapping.

Basilischi (Basilicatan Mafia) 

The Basilischi is a mafia organization founded in 1994 in Potenza. After the maxi-trial in 1999 which caused the capture of many high-ranking members, the group became fractured and fell further under the influence of the more powerful Calabrian-based 'Ndrangheta.

Sacra Corona Unita (Apulian Mafia) 

The Sacra Corona Unita (SCU), or United Sacred Crown, is a Mafia-like criminal organization from the region of Apulia (in Italian Puglia) in Southern Italy, and is especially active in the areas of Brindisi and Lecce and not, as people tend to believe, in the region as a whole. The SCU was founded in the late 1970s as the Nuova Grande Camorra Pugliese, based in Foggia, by the Camorra member Raffaele Cutolo, who wanted to expand his operations into Apulia. It has also been suggested that elements of this group originated from the 'Ndrangheta, but it is not known if they were breakaways from it or the result of indirect co-operation with clans of the 'Ndrangheta.

A few years after the creation of the SCU, following the downfall of Cutolo, the organization began to operate independently from the Camorra under the leadership of Giuseppe Rogoli. Under his leadership the SCU mixed its Apulian interests and opportunities with 'Ndrangheta and Camorra traditions. Originally preying on the region's substantial wine and olive oil industries, the group moved into fraud, gunrunning, and drug trafficking, and made alliances with international criminal organizations such as the Russian and Albanian mafias, the Colombian drug cartels, and some Asian organizations. The Sacra Corona Unita consists of about 50 Clans with approximately 2,000 Core members and specializes in smuggling cigarettes, drugs, arms, and people.

Very few SCU members have been identified in the United States, however there are some links to individuals in Illinois, Florida, and possibly New York. The Sacra Corona Unita is also reported to be involved in money laundering, extortion, and political corruption and collects payoffs from other criminal groups for landing rights on the southeast coast of Italy. This territory is a natural gateway for smuggling to and from post-Communist countries like Croatia, Montenegro, and Albania.

With the decreasing importance of the Adriatic corridor as a smuggling route (thanks to the normalization of the Balkans area) and a series of successful police and judicial operations against it in recent years, the Sacra Corona Unita has been considered, if not actually defeated, to be reduced to a fraction of its former power, which peaked around the mid-1990s.

Local Rivals
The internal difficulties of the SCU aided the birth of antagonistic criminal groups such as:

 Remo Lecce Libera: formed by some leading criminal figures from Lecce, who claim to be independent from any criminal group other than the 'Ndrangheta. The term Remo indicates Remo Morello, a criminal from the Salento area, killed by criminals from the Campania region because he opposed any external interference;
 Nuova Famiglia Salentina: formed in 1986 by De Matteis Pantaleo, from Lecce and stemming from the Famiglia Salentina Libera   born in the early 1980s as an autonomous criminal movement in the Salento area with no links with extra-regional Mafia expressions
 Rosa dei Venti: formed in 1990 by De Tommasi in the Lecce prison, following an internal division in the SCU.

Società foggiana (Foggian mafia) 

The Società foggiana - also known as Mafia Foggiana (Foggian mafia) and the Fifth Mafia - is a mafia-type criminal organization. They are operating in a large part of the Province of Foggia, including the city of Foggia itself, and have significantly infiltrated other Italian regions. Currently, the group is considered one of the most brutal and bloody of all organized crime groups in Italy. There was about one murder a week, one robbery a day, and an extortion attempt every 48 hours in Foggia province in 2017 and 2018. These were wrongly reported as the work of the Sacra Corona Unita (the fourth mafia) by news media, unaware of the new independent mafia in Foggia province. "But that wasn't the case. We are witnessing what should be called a fifth mafia, independent of the Sacra Corona Unita" according to Giuseppe Volpe, a prosecutor and anti-mafia head of Bari. The Società foggiana is known to have numerous alliances with Balkans criminal groups, in particular with the Albanians.

The most powerful clans inside the Società Foggiana are:

 Trisciuoglio clan
 Sinesi-Francavilla clan
 Moretti-Pellegrino-Lanza clan

Mala del Brenta 

The Mala del Brenta has operated throughout the Veneto region in the 1980s and 1990s.

Sicilian mafiosi controlled much of the mafia activity in the Veneto throughout the 1960s and 1970s, and included most notably: Salvatore "Totuccio" Contorno, Gaetano Fidanzati, Antonino Duca, Salvatore and Gaetano Badalamenti, and Giuseppe Madonia. Veneto underworld figures and bandits started to work for these mafiosi in the 1980s.  Sometimes, Felice "Angel Face" Maniero is indicated as the leader of the group.

Banda della Magliana 

The Banda della Magliana (English translation: Magliana Gang) was an Italian criminal organization based in Rome and active mostly throughout the late 1970s until the early 1990s. The gang's name refers to the neighborhood in Rome, the Magliana, from which most of its members came. 

The Magliana Gang was involved in criminal activities during the Italian "years of lead" (or anni di piombo). The organization was tied to other Italian criminal organizations such as the Cosa Nostra, Camorra and the 'Ndrangheta. Most notably though, it was connected to neo-fascist paramilitary and terrorist organizations, including the Nuclei Armati Rivoluzionari (NAR), the group responsible for the 1980 Bologna massacre. 

In addition to their involvement in traditional organized crime rackets, the Banda della Magliana is also believed to have worked for Italian political figures such as Licio Gelli, a grand-master of the illegal and underground freemason lodge known as Propaganda Due (P2), which was purportedly connected to neo-fascist and far-right militant paramilitary groups.

Mafia Capitale 

The Mafia Capitale was a mafia-type crime syndicate, or secret society, that originated in the region of Lazio and its capital Rome.
It was founded in early 2000s by Massimo Carminati from the remains of the Banda della Magliana.

Banda della Comasina and the Turatello Crew 

The Banda della Comasina (English translation: Comasina Gang) was an organized crime group active mainly in Milan, the Milan metropolitan area, and Lombardia in the 1970s and 1980s, or anni di piombo. Their name is derived from the Milan neighborhood of Comasina, the founding location of the organization. The group was led by the Milan crime boss Renato Vallanzasca, a powerful figure in the Milanese underworld in the 1970s. The group began as a smaller robbery and kidnapping gang, and continued to specialize in armed robbery, kidnapping, carjacking, and truck hijacking even as they grew in power and expanded into other subtler areas of organized crime. The gang became notorious for brazenly setting up roadblocks and robbing members of the Milan police force. As the Banda della Comasina rose in power, they expanded into other areas of organized crime, such as arms trafficking, illegal gambling, drug trafficking, contract killing, extortion, racketeering, bootlegging, and corruption.

The group's downfall was partially brought about by its brazen disregard for both subtlety and authority, and its continued reliance on kidnapping and armed robbery to make money. The gang's leader, Renato Vallanzasca, repeatedly escaped from police custody and continued to commit robberies and kidnappings of wealthy and powerful people, even while living as fugitive. In 1976, the group committed approximately 70 robberies and multiple kidnappings (many of which were never reported to police), including the kidnapping of a prominent Bergamo businessman. Several of the robberies resulted in the murder of the robbery victims and responding officers, including four policemen, a doctor and a bank employee. That same year, Vallanzasca (still a fugitive at this point) and his gang kidnapped 16-year-old Emanuela Trapani, the daughter of a Milanese businessman, and held her captive for over a month and a half, from December 1976 to January 1977. They only released the girl upon payment of a one billion randsom in Italian currency. Soon after, the gang killed two highway police officers who had stopped a car containing Vallanzasca and his gang members. Two other members of the Banda della Comasina, Carlo Carluccio and Antonio Furiato, were killed in separate gun battles with policemen, in Piazza Vetra in Milan and on the Autostrada A4 motorway respectively.

Vallanzasca was eventually captured, and while in prison, he developed an alliance and friendship with his former rival, Francis Turatello, another recently incarcerated, powerful crime boss in Milan with strong connections to the Sicilian Mafia, Camorra, and Italian-American Gambino crime family (as well as possible ties to the Banda della Magliana and Italian political terrorist groups). As the leader of the so-called Turatello Crew, Francis Turatello was a protégé of the Sicilian Mafia and an important ally in Milan, for both the Sicilian Mafia and Nuova Camorra Organizzata. The Turatello Crew controlled various illegal rackets in the Milan underworld with the backing of the Sicilian Mafia and Camorra, controlling prostitution in Milan and, like the Banda della Comasina, participating in robbery and kidnapping. 

The Turatello Crew and Banda della Comasina had been in the middle of a gang war with each other when their leaders, Vallanzasca and Turatello, were incarcerated in the same prison, reconciling and bonding there. The newly forged alliance between the two crime groups only increased their influence and power in the Milan underworld, allowing them to control much of Milan's organized crime, even while their leaders remained incarcerated. 

In 1981, Turatello was assassinated in prison by order of Camorra boss Raffaele Cutolo, and the Turatello Crew collapsed while the Banda della Comasina lost an important ally. Soon after Turatello's assassination, Vallanzasca, still imprisoned, organized and participated in a prison revolt in which two pentiti (former gangsters that collaborate with the Italian government) were brutally killed. Despite repeated escape attempts, Vallanzasca remains in prison, serving four consecutive life sentences plus 290 years, and the Banda della Comisina collapsed and disbanded in the early 1980s in his absence.

Italian criminal groups in other countries 

Italian organized crime groups, in particular the Sicilian mafia and the Camorra, have been involved in heroin trafficking for decades. Two major investigations that targeted their drug trafficking schemes in the 1970s and 80s are known as the French Connection and Pizza Connection Trial. These and other investigations have thoroughly documented their cooperation with other major drug trafficking organizations. Italian crime groups are also involved in illegal gambling, political corruption, extortion, kidnapping, frauds, counterfeiting, infiltration of legitimate businesses, murders, bombings, and weapons trafficking. Industry experts in Italy estimate that their worldwide criminal activity is worth more than US$100 billion annually.

The Italian crime groups (especially the Sicilian Mafia) have also connections with Corsican gangs. These collaboration were mostly important during the French Connection era. During the 1990s, the links between the Corsican mafia and the Sicilian mafia facilitated the establishment of some Sicilian gangsters in the Lavezzi Islands.

Those currently active in the United States are the Sicilian Mafia, Camorra or Campanian Mafia, 'Ndrangheta or Calabrian Mafia, and Sacra Corona Unita or "United Sacred Crown". The Federal Bureau of Investigation (FBI) refers to them as "Italian Organized Crime" (IOC). These Italian crime groups frequently collaborate with the Italian-American Mafia, which is itself an offshoot of the Sicilian Mafia.

Outside of Italy, the United States, and Southern France, the Sicilian Mafia and the 'Ndrangheta have also established strongholds in Belgium, Canada (Rizzuto crime family, Musitano crime family, Papalia crime family, Luppino crime family, Cotroni crime family, Commisso 'ndrina, Siderno Group); Australia (Siderno Group, The Carlton Crew, Honoured Society, Barbaro 'ndrina); and Germany (see Duisburg massacre). In particular the 'Ndrangheta and the Camorra consider the UK an area of interest for laundering money, using financial companies and business activities, while having large investments in London.

Outside Italy, the Camorra is particularly present in Spain, the Netherlands and France. Its presence in the countries is mostly related to drug trafficking and money laundering.

The 'Ndrangheta has carved out turf and formed close ties with organized crime groups in Latin American countries such as Colombia, Brazil, and Argentina. The Camorra also maintains important drug import routes from South America since the 1980s. And the Sicilian mafia has a presence in Venezuela, with the Cuntrera-Caruana Mafia clan in particular having established a strong settlement.

Non-Italian criminal groups in Italy 

There are a small number of similar criminal organizations operating in Italy. They are mostly based outside of Italy, or composed of non-Italians living in Italy, such as the Chinese Triads, Russian, Georgian, Nigerian gangs, and Balkan crime groups including the Greek, Serbian, Romanian, Bulgarian, Montenegrin (who ran cigarette smuggling operations with the Sacra Corona Unita) and the Albanian mafia. The Albanian gangs mainly operate in Milan and Rome but are now starting to expand within the southern regions of Italy after the local Mafia crackdown went under way. 

All these organizations focus their ambitions on prostitution and drug trafficking, under the control and with permissions of the Italian organized crime groups.

See also 

 Crime in Italy

References 

 
Organized crime-related lists

es:Mafia en Italia
it:Mafia in Italia